Jora may be,

Jora language (Siriono)
Chicha de jora (a type of corn)
Jora Vision

Places
Jora, Kenya
Jora de Mijloc, Moldova
Jora Wielka, Poland
Jora Bangla Temple
Jora Mała, Poland

People
Mihail Jora
Nawang Rigzin Jora
Soha Jora
Jora Harutyunyan
Jora Singh

See also
Jora Jora